Gerardo Arturo Sánchez-Azofeifa is a full professor at the University of Alberta, the director of the university's Center for Earth Observation Sciences, and the director of Tropi-Dry, a research group focusing on land use/policy studies in tropical dry regions of the Americas. His research is related to the study of impacts of land use/cover change (LUCC) on biodiversity loss and habitat fragmentation in tropical dry forest environments.

Current Research 
Sánchez-Azofeifa uses advanced technology, including remote sensing and phenology towers, to evaluate land use and cover change in Mesoamerica. His research focuses on the efficacy of creating protected areas (National Parks and Biological Reserves) and use of Environmental Services payment methods to control tropical deforestation. In addition, his research examines remote sensing (multispectral and hyperspectral) in connection with Primary Productivity (PP), Leaf Area Index (LAI), Photosynthetic Active Radiation (PAR) and biodiversity, particularly in tropical secondary dry forests. He is currently developing techniques to identify and understand the relationship of lianas (non-self supporting tropical plants) and tropical hardwood species by means of hyperspectral remote sensing to generate data reflecting detailed leaf and canopy level information. Sánchez-Azofeifa's most cited paper is his 2006 Nature article, "Widespread amphibian extinctions from epidemic disease driven by global warming."

Awards, honours and other recognition 
 Essential Science Indicators, Thomson Reuters Top 1% in the field of Environment & Ecology (2009)
 McCalla Research Professorship (2008–2009)
 Taylor & Francis Best Research Letter Award published by the International Journal of Remote Sensing (2007)
 2007 Canadian Forest Service Merit Award
 University of Alberta's Faculty of Sciences Research Award for Outstanding Contributions to Research (2007)
 Fellow of the Aldo Leopold Leadership Program (2006) at the Wood's Institute for Environment, Stanford University
 Fulbright Fellowship (1990–1996)

References

Living people
Year of birth missing (living people)
Academic staff of the University of Alberta
Canadian hydrologists
University of New Hampshire alumni
Academic staff of the University of Costa Rica
Canadian civil engineers
University of Costa Rica alumni
Engineers from Alberta